Chhintang  is a village in Shahidbhumi Rural Municipality in the Dhankuta District of Province No. 1 in eastern Nepal. At the time of the 1991 Nepal census it had a population of 8071 people living in 1374 individual households. The Chintang language is primarily spoken in Chhintang.

See also
Chhintang massacre

References

Populated places in Dhankuta District